A droshky or drosky is a term used for several types of carriage, including:
 A low, four-wheeled open carriage used especially in Russia. It consists of a long bench on which the passengers ride sideways or astride, as on a saddle, with their feet on bars near the ground.
 Various two-wheeled or four-wheeled public carriages used in Russia and other countries.  Dray cart.

From droga, the pole that connects the front and rear axles. Likely related to OE dragan, "to drag."

See also
 Carriage#Types of horse-drawn carriages

References

Carriages
Russian inventions